The 1993 Arizona State Sun Devils football team was an American football team that represented Arizona State University in the Pacific-10 Conference (Pac-10) during the 1993 NCAA Division I-A football season. In their second season under head coach Bruce Snyder, the Sun Devils compiled a 6–5 record (4–4 against Pac-10 opponents), finished in a tie for fifth place in the Pac-10, and outscored their opponents by a combined total of 282 to 248.

The team's statistical leaders included Jake Plummer with 1,650 passing yards, Mario Bates with 1,111 rushing yards, and Johnny Thomas with 574 receiving yards.

Schedule

Roster

References

Arizona State
Arizona State Sun Devils football seasons
Arizona State Sun Devils football